Sergé "Jojo" Mayer (born 18 January 1963) is a Swiss virtuoso drummer born in Zürich and currently residing in New York City.

Mayer is the son of touring musician and bass player Vali Mayer and the brother of actress Delia Mayer. He began his career as a drummer at an early age, receiving his first drum set at the age of two. Having taught himself throughout his childhood, he broke out into the professional music scene at the age of 18, joining the Monty Alexander group. Touring with the group launched him into the major jazz music scene, and he has played at the North Sea Jazz Festival, Montreux, Nice, and Athens etc., which culminated with his gigging with jazz-greats such as Dizzy Gillespie and Nina Simone. Eventually, after playing with a great variety of artists, Mayer moved away from jazz and into Drum 'n' Bass.

Jojo Mayer is known for bringing together jazz, drum and bass, jungle, and other influences. He is also famous for his ability to play the rhythms of programmed jungle drum 'n' bass music on acoustic drums, terming this technique "reverse engineering", a phrase borrowed from computing. He executes this approach using various methods such as the heel-toe bass drum technique, the Moeller stroke, the Valving technique, and the "pull-out" or "push-pull" accent which takes the beat on the rebound. Using these techniques, he can play beats at astonishing speeds. A few of his main influences are Tony Williams, Jack DeJohnette and Buddy Rich.

He is the leader of live electronica trio Nerve, which he founded in 1997.

He played with the guitarist David Fiuczynski in the avant-garde jazz rock band Screaming Headless Torsos and in the fusion jazz band, Intergalactic Maiden Ballet.

He ran the popular Prohibited Beatz live electronica party in NYC from 1996–2001.

Discography

With Intergalactic Maiden Ballet:
1992 - Square Dance
1994 - Gulf

With John Medeski:
1994 - Lunar Crush

With Screaming Headless Torsos:
1995 - Screaming Headless Torsos

With Harry Sokal:
1996 - Rave the Jazz! :live:

Sulfur:
1998 - Delirium Tremens

With Leo Tardin
2005 - Grand Pianoramax

With Janek Gwizdala:
2004 - Mystery To Me - Live in New York
2010 - The Space in Between
2011 - Live at the Jamboree June 17th 2011 1st set
2011 - Live at the Jamboree June 17th 2011 2nd set
2011 - Live at the Jamboree June 18th 2011 1st set
2011 - Live at the Jamboree June 18th 2011 2nd set
2012 - It Only Happens Once

With Depart
1987 - Depart
2006 - Reloaded
2008 - Mountain Messenger

With Rebekka Bakken
2009 - Art of How to Fall

With Trace Elements
2015 - Electric Job (Live in Teramo)

Nerve (Jojo Mayer, John Davis, Jacob Bergson):
 2007 - Prohibited Beatz
 2010 - EP1
 2010 - EP2
 2011 - EP3
 2011 - The Distance Between Zero And One
 2012 - EP4
 2014 - EP5
 2015 - Live in Europe
 2015 - Ghosts of Tomorrow
 2016 - Vocal Collaborations
 2017 - Nerve
 2018 - After the Flare
 2019 - Lunar Tribute

DVDs:
 2007 - Secret Weapons for the Modern Drummer: part 1
 2014 - Secret Weapons for the Modern Drummer: part 2

Media 

He was featured as the cover story of the January 2008 issue of Modern Drummer magazine. Jojo Mayer was interviewed by DrummerConnection.com in May 2010, and by Linus Wyrsch on "The Jazz Hole" for breakthruradio.com in July 2010.

Gear
Mayer is a long-time Sonor endorser who also uses Sabian cymbals, Vic Firth sticks and Evans Drumheads. He helped Sonor design the Jungle kit and snare. He has also collaborated with Sabian to create two lines of cymbals, the Vault "Fierce" series, and "Omni" series, which includes both AAX and HHX models. His Vault Fierce cymbals feature a raw, unlathed finish, and extensive hand hammering, while the Omnis are designed to function as both rides and crashes.
He also helped to develop the hoop crash of Sabian and the perfect balance (single pedal of Sonor).

References

External links
 
 Jojo Mayer's Nerve Info at Basitours
 2013 Audio Interview with Jojo from the podcast "I'd Hit That"
 An interview with Jojo Mayer by The Drummer’s Journal, 2014

1963 births
Living people
Swiss drummers
Swiss male musicians
Male drummers
Jazz drummers
Swiss emigrants to the United States
Male jazz musicians
Vienna Art Orchestra members
Screaming Headless Torsos members